The Erie Canal Soda Pop Festival also known colloquially as the Bull Island Rock Festival, was a rock festival held on the Labor Day weekend of 1972 near Griffin, Indiana on Bull Island, a strip of land in Illinois but on the Indiana side of the Wabash River. A crowd estimated at 200,000 to 300,000 attended the concert, four times what the promoters estimated. Food and water were in short supply, and the gathering descended into relative chaos. After the show was finished, remnants of the crowd burned the main stage.

History

Planning

Several months before the festival, promoters Tom Duncan and Bob Alexander held a very successful small festival at Bosse Field in Evansville, Indiana, the Freedom Festival and Ice Cream Social. That show included acts such as Ike and Tina Turner, New Riders of the Purple Sage, and Edgar Winter. Based on that success, Duncan and Alexander planned a bigger festival.

The Erie Canal "Soda" Pop Festival was originally slated for Chandler, Indiana, a small town near Evansville, Indiana. However, various court battles stopped the festival from performance anywhere in the Hoosier State. Shortly before the start of the concert, the promoters decided on a site near Griffin in Posey County, Indiana referred to locally as "Bull Island".

Due to the changing course of the Wabash River, Bull Island is located east of the Wabash River but is part of the State of Illinois. Thus, Bull Island was out of the jurisdiction of the various Indiana courts. The White County, Illinois government in the city of Carmi was surprised that the venue had suddenly ended up in its backyard, and was unable to stop the concert.

The concert

The promoters initially estimated a crowd of 55,000. As the Labor Day approached, it became obvious that a much larger crowd was coming to the festival. As Bull Island was accessible by only two roads, traffic was backed up for 20 miles (30 km) from the festival. Since Bull Island was technically part of Illinois but the only access was through Indiana, police protection and crowd control during the festival were non-existent. Coordination between the Indiana police and the Illinois police was woefully inadequate. The only police on the festival grounds were three county deputy sheriffs from White County, Illinois trying to police a crowd of 200,000 to 300,000.

The scheduled lineup included Black Sabbath, Joe Cocker, the Allman Brothers, John Mayall, Cheech & Chong, Canned Heat, Fleetwood Mac, Ballin' Jack, Amboy Dukes, Bob Seger, Bang, Ravi Shankar, Albert King, the Doors, Brownsville Station, Mike Quatro, Gentle Giant, Black Oak Arkansas, the Eagles, The Chambers Brothers, Boones Farm, Slade, Birtha, Nazareth, and Delbert & Glenn. However, the only actual performers included Flash Cadillac & the Continental Kids, Black Oak Arkansas, Ramatam, Mike Quatro, Bang, Cheech & Chong, Foghat, Albert King, Brownsville Station, Santana, Canned Heat, Flash, Ravi Shankar, Rory Gallagher, Lee Michaels and Frosty, Amboy Dukes, Farm, CK Thunder, the Eagles, Birtha, and Gentle Giant. Vince Vance and the Valiants played after Ted Nugent of The Amboy Dukes.

Difficulties and aftermath

Over the three days, the festival drifted steadily into chaos. Food and water were in short supply. A torrential rain soaked the festival. A truck bringing food into the festival was hijacked, looted and burned. When some vendors overcharged for food and drinks, the crowd turned over many of the RVs and robbed the vendors. On the Sunday evening, some starving festival-goers killed a local's cow that was still on the island, but did not have any means of butchering it. Drugs were freely available in a makeshift "shopping district", where dealers openly displayed their illegal goods. Numerous bands quickly cancelled, and three concert goers drowned in the Wabash River. As the festival ended, what was left of the crowd destroyed the music stand by fire.

The promoters later explained that they had sold 30,000 advance tickets for $20 and $25 each, and had estimated a crowd of no more than 55,000 would attend. Thus they were completely unprepared when more than 200,000 people showed up.

Following the concert, the promoters were subjected to multiple lawsuits by the owner of Bull Island, the vendors, the Internal Revenue Service, the State of Illinois, and the State of Indiana. The court found the promoters to be in contempt of court and fined them several thousand dollars.

See also

List of jam band music festivals

References

External links 

Evansville Courier, September 2, 2012.
Evansville Courier & Press 150th Anniversary Special Section, January 8, 1995.
Illinois History Teacher Magazine, Vol 1, 1994
 The Bull Island Rock Festival (Book)

1972 in music
Rock festivals in the United States
Pop music festivals in the United States
Music festivals established in 1972
Folk festivals in the United States
1972 music festivals